T. O. Bava (20 January 1919 - 26 July 2007) was an Indian politician of Congress party. Bava represented Aluva in the first and second Kerala Legislative Assembly. Bava had also a member of the Tirukochi Legislative Assembly from 1954 to 1956. He has served as the director of Ernakulam District Cooperative Bank as well as the chairman of Ernakulam District Khadigram Industry Board. Bava had been also elected as the president of K.P.C.C.

References

1919 births
2007 deaths
Members of the Kerala Legislative Assembly